Alain Roche (born 14 October 1967) is a French former professional footballer who played as a defender. He spent significant time at Paris Saint-Germain, where he notably won the European Cup Winners' Cup. He earned his first international cap for France on 19 November 1988 against Yugoslavia in a 3–2 loss.

He played for Bordeaux, Marseille, Auxerre, Paris SG and Valencia. Whilst at PSG he scored when they won both the 1993 Coupe de France Final and the 1995 Coupe de la Ligue Final.

Honours
Bordeaux
Division 1: 1986–87
Coupe de France: 1985–86, 1986–87

Marseille
Division 1: 1989–90

Paris SG
Division 1: 1993–94
Coupe de France: 1992–93, 1994–95, 1997–98
Coupe de la Ligue: 1994–95, 1997–98
UEFA Cup Winners' Cup: 1995–96

Valencia
Copa del Rey: 1998–99
UEFA Intertoto Cup: 1998

France U21
UEFA European Under-21 Championship: 1988

References

External links
 
 

1967 births
Living people
People from Brive-la-Gaillarde
Sportspeople from Corrèze
French footballers
France under-21 international footballers
France international footballers
Association football defenders
Ligue 1 players
FC Girondins de Bordeaux players
Olympique de Marseille players
AJ Auxerre players
Paris Saint-Germain F.C. players
La Liga players
Valencia CF players
UEFA Euro 1996 players
French expatriate footballers
Expatriate footballers in Spain
French expatriate sportspeople in Spain
Footballers from Nouvelle-Aquitaine